Phytosemiotics is a branch of biosemiotics that studies the sign processes in plants, or more broadly, the vegetative semiosis. Vegetative semiosis is a type of sign processes that occurs at cellular and tissue level, including cellular recognition, plant perception, plant signal transduction, intercellular communication, immunological processes, etc.

The term 'phytosemiotics' was introduced by Martin Krampen in 1981.

See also
Plant perception (physiology)
Plant communication
Hormonal sentience
Zoosemiotics
International Society for Biosemiotic Studies

References

Affifi, Ramsey 2013. Learning plants: Semiotics between the parts and the whole. Biosemiotics 6: 547–559.
Faucher, Kane 2014. Phytosemiotics revisited: Botanical behavior and sign transduction. Semiotica 202: 673–688.
Krampen, Martin 1981. Phytosemiotics. Semiotica 36(3/4): 187–209.
Krampen, Martin 1992. Phytosemiotics revisited. In: Sebeok, Thomas A.; Umiker-Sebeok, Jean (eds.), Biosemiotics: The Semiotic Web 1991. Berlin: Mouton de Gruyter, 213–219.
Kull, Kalevi 2000. An introduction to phytosemiotics: Semiotic botany and vegetative sign systems. Sign Systems Studies 28: 326–350.
Kull, Kalevi 2009. Vegetative, animal, and cultural semiosis: The semiotic threshold zones. Cognitive Semiotics 4: 8–27.

Semiotics
Botany
Plant cognition